In Greek mythology, Axylus (Ancient Greek: Ἄξυλος) was a Trojan warrior who participated in the Trojan War.

Family 
Axylus was the son of Teuthranus.

Mythology 
Axylus was a wealthy and young man who came from the town of Arisbe, a city in the Troad. He was killed by Diomedes during the siege of Troy.

This character was mentioned in Book VI of Homer's Iliad:Diomedes, expert in war cries, killed Axylus,son of Teuthranus, a rich man, from well-built Arisbe.People really loved him, for he lived beside a road,welcomed all passers-by into his home.But not one of those men he'd entertained now stoodin front of him, protecting him from wretched death.Diomedes took the lives of two men--Axylus,and his attendant Calesius, his charioteer.So both men went down into the underworld.

Notes

References 
Homer, The Iliad with an English Translation by A.T. Murray, Ph.D. in two volumes. Cambridge, MA., Harvard University Press; London, William Heinemann, Ltd. 1924. . Online version at the Perseus Digital Library.
Homer, Homeri Opera in five volumes. Oxford, Oxford University Press. 1920. . Greek text available at the Perseus Digital Library.
Translation of the Iliad by Ian Johnston.

Characters in the Iliad